Bruno Radotić (born 28 June 1983 in Zagreb) is a Croatian cyclist. He is the brother of Mia Radotić.

Major results

2006
 3rd Time trial, National Road Championships
2008
 2nd Time trial, National Road Championships
2009
 1st  Time trial, National Road Championships
2010
 2nd Time trial, National Road Championships
2011
 3rd Time trial, National Road Championships
2017
 National Road Championships
2nd Time trial
3rd Road race

References

External links

1983 births
Living people
Croatian male cyclists
Sportspeople from Zagreb